Õnne Pollisinski (before 1971 Õnne Simson; born on 5 March 1951 in Tallinn) is an Estonian underwater sportwoman, swimming coach and sport personnel.

From 1967 to 1971 she won several medals at Estonian championships.

From 1973 to 2006 she worked as a coach at sport club Kalev. Since 1991 she is working at sport club Meduus, coaching the disabled swimming sportpeople.

From 2012 to 2015 she was the president of Estonian Underwater Federation.

Students: Kardo Ploomipuu, Tiina Krutob, Aini Leik.

Awards:
 1985: Estonian SSR merited coach
 2012: Order of the White Star, V class.

References

Living people
1951 births
Estonian sports coaches
Estonian female swimmers
Recipients of the Order of the White Star, 5th Class
Tallinn University alumni
Swimmers from Tallinn